Einar Þorvarðarson (born 12 August 1957) is an Icelandic former handball player who competed in the 1984 Summer Olympics and in the 1988 Summer Olympics.

References

1957 births
Living people
Einar Thorvardarson
Einar Thorvardarson
Handball players at the 1984 Summer Olympics
Handball players at the 1988 Summer Olympics